Manjari Makijany is an Indian writer, director and producer who works on American and Hindi films. She is best known for her award-winning short films, The Last Marble (2012) and The Corner Table (2014).

Early life
Makijany is the daughter of Bollywood actor Mac Mohan and cousin of actress Raveena Tandon.

Career
Makijany was one of eight women chosen to participate in the AFI Conservatory's Directing Workshop for Women in 2016. She is the second Indian to participate in the program since its inception in 1974. As part of the AFI DWW she directed, I See You (2016), a dramatic thriller about a suicide bomber who has a change of heart on the New York City Subway. She is also one of 25 Women selected to participant in the inaugural Fox Filmmakers Lab in 2017. Manjari was one of eight filmmakers selected to participate in the inaugural Universal Pictures Directors Intensive in 2017.

Makijany completed UCLA's Professional Screenwriters Program, where she developed her feature screenplay, City of Gold. The script was nominated for the Nate Wilson's Joie De Vivre Award in 2015.

Makijany worked as an Assistant Director on Indian films Wake Up Sid and Saat Khoon Maaf. She also worked on Disney's live action-animation Lilly the Witch: The Journey to Mandolan, Gandhi of the Month and the Indian schedules of Mission: Impossible – Ghost Protocol and The Dark Knight Rises.

Makijany's foray into writing and directing began with a 7-minute silent film, The Last Marble (2012) that premiered at the Seattle International Film Festival and received much critical appreciation winning International awards for "Best Film" at Indian Film Festival of Melbourne. The film was included as the ‘Best of Fest’ at the Clermont-Ferrand International Short Film Festival and screened in over 30 International festivals.

The Corner Table (2014) was her second film and featured Tom Alter. The 24-minute short film was nominated for "Best Film" at the New York Indian Film Festival (2014). The film was a part of the Cannes Short Film Corner and an "Official Selection" of the Emerging Filmmakers Showcase at the American Pavilion - Cannes Film Festival. Manjari was the only Indian woman filmmaker chosen as part of this showcase.

In 2019, Makijany began filming Skater Girl (2021), a narrative feature film written by Vinati Makijany and Manjari Makijany which follows the story of a teenage tribal girl in Rajasthan, India who discovers skateboarding after a thirty-something British-Indian woman introduces skateboarding to a village. Skater Girl is Makijany's directorial debut feature and was filmed on location in Khempur, Udaipur, Rajasthan in 2019. The film introduces newcomer Rachel Sanchita Gupta, and stars Amrit Maghera, Jonathan Readwin, Swati Das, Ankit Rao, and Waheeda Rehman. As part of the film, the producers built Rajasthan's first and, at the time India's largest, skatepark. Spanning over 15,000 sq ft, it remains a public skatepark facility for children and visiting skaters.

Her next release in 2021 was Disney Channel original film Spin, a film about an Indian American teen who learns she has a passion for creating DJ mixes.

References

External links 
 

1980s births
Living people
Indian women film directors
Indian women film producers
21st-century Indian women artists
Indian women filmmakers
Screenwriters from Mumbai
Film producers from Mumbai
Film directors from Mumbai
21st-century Indian film directors
Indian women screenwriters
Women artists from Maharashtra
Indian women documentary filmmakers
Businesswomen from Maharashtra